The Women's scratch competition at the 2020 UCI Track Cycling World Championships was held on 26 February 2020.

Results
The race was started at 19:58. First rider across the line without a net lap loss won.

References

Women's scratch
UCI Track Cycling World Championships – Women's scratch